Capital City Airport may refer to:

 Capital City Airport (Pennsylvania), in Harrisburg, Pennsylvania, United States (FAA: CXY)
 Capital City Airport (Kentucky), in Frankfort, Kentucky, United States (FAA: FFT)
 Capital Region International Airport, formerly Capital City Airport, in Lansing, Michigan, United States (FAA: LAN)

See also
Capital Airport (disambiguation)